The Cinema Evaluation Board (CEB) is a body of the Film Development Council of the Philippines, tasked with grading Filipino films by quality. It is represented in the Philippine Film Export Services Office.

The CEB was established in 2003, succeeding the Film Ratings Board (FRB) which became defunct in early 2002. Like its predecessor, it gives tax rebates to films depending on their grading but unlike the FRB, the CEB's powers to give tax rebates is mandated by law.

References

Film organizations in the Philippines
2003 establishments in the Philippines